Sulcus spiralis may refer to:

 Sulcus spiralis externus
 Sulcus spiralis internus